Alexander Bone (born 26 December 1971 in Stirling) is a retired Scottish footballer who played as a forward. Bone began his career with St Mirren before moving to Stirling Albion in the mid-1990s. Bone went on to score more than a goal every two games for the Albion before winning an £80,000 move to Ayr United in 1999. Despite scoring on his début for Ayr, Bone spent the final few months of the season on loan, spending time back at Stirling and then latterly at Ross County. Such was his impact at County – he scored in the final four matches of the season – that he moved there on a permanent deal for the start of the next season. Months into his permanent spell, Bone received a five-match ban for accumulating three red cards in a match. Bone stayed at Victoria Park until early 2003 when he moved to Peterhead on a short-term deal, before spending just over a year with Elgin City. Shortly into the 2004-05 season, Bone joined Clachnacuddin, spending three years with The Lilywhites. In the summer of 2007, Bone moved on to Forres Mechanics. In 2008, Bone left Forres for Muir of Ord Rovers in the North Caledonian League before joining league rivals Golspie Sutherland the season after, before heading back South to join Kinnoull.

In a 2004 poll by the BBC, Bone came third in a vote to find Stirling Albion’s all-time hero.

Bone is the nephew of former Scotland player Jimmy Bone.

References

External links
 
 

1971 births
Living people
Footballers from Stirling
Scottish footballers
Scottish Football League players
St Mirren F.C. players
Stirling Albion F.C. players
Ayr United F.C. players
Ross County F.C. players
Peterhead F.C. players
Elgin City F.C. players
Forres Mechanics F.C. players
Association football forwards
Clachnacuddin F.C. players
Muir of Ord Rovers F.C. players
Golspie Sutherland F.C. players
Kinnoull F.C. players